Stefan Junge (born 1 September 1950 in Leipzig, Sachsen) is a German former athlete, who stood 195 cm and weighed 85 kg, who mainly competed in the high jump.

Junge competed for East Germany in the 1972 Summer Olympics held in Munich, Germany where he won the silver medal in the men's high jump event.

References

1950 births
Living people
East German male high jumpers
Olympic silver medalists for East Germany
Athletes (track and field) at the 1972 Summer Olympics
Olympic athletes of East Germany
Athletes from Leipzig
Medalists at the 1972 Summer Olympics
Olympic silver medalists in athletics (track and field)